George Grierson (10 May 1905 – 1962) was a Scottish footballer who played league football as a wing half for Preston North End and Rochdale.

References

Royal Albert F.C. players
Preston North End F.C. players
Ashton National F.C. players
Rochdale A.F.C. players
People from Lesmahagow
1905 births
1962 deaths
Scottish footballers
Association football midfielders